The 1955 Colorado A&M Aggies football team represented Colorado State College of Agriculture and Mechanic Arts in the Skyline Conference during the 1955 college football season.  In their ninth and final season under head coach Bob Davis, the Aggies compiled an 8–2 record (6–1 against Skyline opponents), won the conference championship, and outscored all opponents by a total of 175 to 108.

Three Colorado Agricultural players received all-conference honors in 1955: halfback Gary Glick, center Bob Weber, and guard Dan Mirich. Bob Davis was also named Skyline Conference Coach of the Year.

The team's statistical leaders included Jerry Callahan with 302 passing yards, Gary Glick with 579 rushing yards and 48 points scored, and Gary Sanders with 351 receiving yards.

Bob Davis resigned as Colorado A&M's head football coach in January 1956 in order to devote his full energy to his duties as the school's athletic director.

Schedule

References

Colorado AandM
Colorado State Rams football seasons
Mountain States Conference football champion seasons
Colorado AandM Aggies football